Eddie Asner (November 15, 1929 – August 29, 2021) was an American actor and former president of the Screen Actors Guild. He is best remembered for portraying Lou Grant during the 1970s and early 1980s, on both The Mary Tyler Moore Show and its spin-off series Lou Grant, making him one of the few television actors to portray the same character in both a comedy and a drama. Asner is the most honored male performer in the history of the Primetime Emmy Awards, having won seven – five for portraying Lou Grant (three as Supporting Actor in a Comedy Television Series on The Mary Tyler Moore Show and two as Lead Actor in a Dramatic Television Series on spin-off Lou Grant. His other Emmys were for performances in two television miniseries: Rich Man, Poor Man (1976), for which he won the Outstanding Lead Actor for a Single Performance in a television series award, and Roots (1977), for which he won the Outstanding Single Performance by a Supporting Actor in a television series award.

Asner played John Wayne's adversary Bart Jason in the 1966 Western El Dorado. He portrayed Santa Claus in several films, including in 2003's Elf. In 2007, he voiced the main villain Krad in Christmas Is Here Again. In 2009, he voiced Carl Fredricksen in Pixar's animated film Up and made a guest appearance on CSI: NY in the episode "Yahrzeit". In early 2011, Asner returned to television as butcher Hank Greziak in Working Class, the first original sitcom on cable channel CMT. He starred in Michael, Tuesdays and Thursdays, on CBC Television and appeared in The Glades. Asner guest-starred as Guy Redmayne in the sixth season of The Good Wife. He had a guest role in Cobra Kai, appearing as Sid Weinberg in seasons one and three. In 2020, he had a recurring role as James Staghorne Sr. on Briarpatch. As a voice actor, he voiced Roland Daggett and Granny Goodness in the DC Animated Universe and J. Jonah Jameson in the 1994 Spider-Man series.

Early life
Eddie Asner was born on November 15, 1929, in Kansas City, Missouri, and grew up in Kansas City, Kansas. His Ashkenazi Jewish immigrant parents, Lizzie (née Seliger; 1885–1967, from Odesa, Ukraine), a housewife, and Morris David Asner (1877–1957, from Lithuania (Vilna Governorate or Grodno Governorate), ran a second-hand shop and junkyard. The youngest of five children, his four older siblings were: Ben J. Asner (1915–1986), Eve Asner (1916–2014), Esther Edelman (1919–2014) and Labe Asner (1923–2017). He was raised in an Orthodox Jewish family and given the Hebrew name Yitzhak.

Asner attended Wyandotte High School in Kansas City, Kansas, and the University of Chicago. He studied journalism in Chicago until a professor advised him there was little money to be made in the profession. He had been working in a steel mill, but he quickly switched to drama, debuting as the martyred Thomas Becket in a campus production of T. S. Eliot's Murder in the Cathedral. He eventually dropped out of school, going to work as a taxi driver, worked on the assembly line for General Motors, and other odd jobs before being drafted in the military in 1951.

Asner served with the U.S. Army Signal Corps from 1951 to 1953 and appeared in plays that toured Army bases in Europe.

Career

Following his military service, Asner helped found the Playwrights Theatre Company in Chicago, but left for New York City before members of that company regrouped as the Compass Players in the mid-1950s. He later made frequent guest appearances with the successor to Compass, The Second City. In New York City, Asner played Jonathan Jeremiah Peachum in the Off-Broadway revival of Threepenny Opera, scored his first Broadway role in Face of a Hero alongside Jack Lemmon in 1960, and began to make inroads as a television actor, having made his TV debut in 1957 on Studio One. In two notable performances on television, Asner played Detective Sgt. Thomas Siroleo in the 1963 episode of The Outer Limits titled "It Crawled Out of the Woodwork" and the reprehensible ex-premier Brynov in the 1965 Voyage to the Bottom of the Sea episode "The Exile". He made his film debut in 1962, in the Elvis Presley vehicle Kid Galahad.

Before he landed his role with Mary Tyler Moore, Asner guest-starred in television series including four episodes of The Untouchables starring Robert Stack, the syndicated crime drama Decoy, starring Beverly Garland, and Route 66 in 1962 (the episode titled "Welcome to the Wedding") as Custody Officer Lincoln Peers. He was cast on Jack Lord's ABC drama series Stoney Burke and in the series finale of CBS's The Reporter, starring Harry Guardino. He also appeared on Mr. Novak, Ben Casey, Gunsmoke,  Mission: Impossible, The Outer Limits, The Fugitive, and The Invaders. In 1963, Asner appeared as George Johnson on The Virginian in the episode "Echo of Another Day".

Asner was best known for his character Lou Grant, who was first introduced on The Mary Tyler Moore Show in 1970. In 1977, after Moore's series ended, Asner's character was given his own show, Lou Grant (1977–82). In contrast to the Mary Tyler Moore series, a thirty-minute award-winning comedy about television journalism, the Lou Grant series was an hour-long award-winning drama about newspaper journalism (for his role as Grant, Asner was one of only two actors to win an Emmy Award for a sitcom and a drama for the same role, with the second being Uzo Aduba). In addition he made appearances as Lou Grant on two other shows: Rhoda and Roseanne. Other television series starring Asner in regular roles include Thunder Alley, The Bronx Zoo, and Studio 60 on the Sunset Strip. He also starred in one episode of the western series Dead Man's Gun (1997), as well as portraying art smuggler August March in an episode of the original Hawaii Five-O (1975) and reprised the role in the Hawaii Five-0 (2012) remake. He also appeared as a veteran streetwise officer in an episode of the 1973 version of Police Story.

Asner was acclaimed for his role in the ABC miniseries Roots, as Captain Davies, the morally conflicted captain of the Lord Ligonier, the slave ship that brought Kunta Kinte to America. The role earned Asner an Emmy Award, as did the similarly dark role of Axel Jordache in the miniseries Rich Man, Poor Man (1976). In contrast, he played a former pontiff in the lead role of Papa Giovanni: Ioannes XXIII (Pope John XXIII 2002), an Italian television film for RAI.

Asner had an extensive voice acting career. In 1987, he played the eponymous character, George F. Babbitt, in the L.A. Classic Theatre Works' radio theater production of Sinclair Lewis' novel Babbitt. Asner won one Audie Award and was nominated for two Grammy Awards and an additional Audie for his audiobook work. He also provided the voices for Joshua on Joshua and the Battle of Jericho (1986) for Hanna-Barbera, J. Jonah Jameson on the 1990s animated television series Spider-Man (1994–98); Hoggish Greedly on Captain Planet and the Planeteers (1990–95); Hudson on Gargoyles (1994–96); Jabba the Hutt on the radio version of Star Wars; Master Vrook from Star Wars: Knights of the Old Republic and its sequel; Roland Daggett on Batman: The Animated Series (1992–94); Cosgrove on Freakazoid!; Ed Wuncler on The Boondocks (2005–14); and Granny Goodness in various DC Comics animated series. He also voiced Napoleon, Cornelia's younger sister's cat in the Disney show W.I.T.C.H., and Kid Potato, the Butcher's dad in the PBS Kids show hit WordGirl. He was even nominated for a Daytime Emmy Award for Outstanding Performer in an Animated Program but lost to Eartha Kitt for Nick Jr.'s The Wonder Pets. Asner provided the voice of famed American orator Edward Everett in the 2017 documentary film The Gettysburg Address.

Asner provided the voice of the main protagonist Carl Fredricksen in the Academy Award-winning Pixar film Up (2009). He received critical acclaim for the role, with one critic going so far as to suggest "They should create a new category for this year's Academy Award for Best Vocal Acting in an Animated Film and name Asner as the first recipient." He appeared in the mid- to late-2000s decade in a recurring segment on The Tonight Show with Jay Leno, entitled "Does This Impress Ed Asner?" He was cast in a Country Music Television comedy pilot, Regular Joe.

In 2001, Asner was the recipient of the Screen Actors Guild Life Achievement Award.

Asner won more Emmy Awards for performing than any other male actor (seven, including five for the role of Lou Grant). In 1996, he was inducted into the Academy of Television Arts & Sciences Hall of Fame. In July 2010, Asner completed recording sessions for Shattered Hopes: The True Story of the Amityville Murders; a documentary on the 1974 DeFeo murders in Amityville, New York. Asner served as the narrator for the film, which covers a forensic analysis of the murders, the trial in which 23-year-old DeFeo son Ronald DeFeo Jr., was convicted of the killings, and the subsequent "haunting" story which is revealed to be a hoax. Also in 2010, Asner played the title role in FDR, a stage production about the life of Franklin Delano Roosevelt; he subsequently continued to tour the play throughout the country. In January 2011, Asner took a supporting role on CMT's first original sitcom Working Class. He made an appearance in the independent comedy feature Not Another B Movie, and had a role as billionaire Warren Buffett in HBO's economic drama Too Big to Fail (2011). In 2013, he guest starred as Mr. Finger in The Crazy Ones.

Asner also provided voice-over narration for many documentaries and films about social activism, including Tiger by the Tail, a documentary film detailing the efforts of Eric Mann and the Campaign to keep General Motors' Van Nuys assembly plant running. He also recorded for a public radio show and podcast, Playing On Air, appearing in Warren Leight's The Final Interrogation of Ceaucescu's Dog with Jesse Eisenberg, and Mike Reiss's New York Story. Asner was the voice-over narrator for the 2016 documentary Behind the Fear: The Hidden Story of HIV, directed by Nicole Zwiren, a controversial study on the AIDS debate.

A 2014 documentary titled My Friend Ed, directed by Sharon Baker, focused on the actor's life and career. It won Best Short Documentary at the New York City Independent Film Festival.

During interviews for a 2019 book on the history of Chicago theater, Asner told the author he preferred to be credited for his work as "Edward" rather than "Ed" because he felt the longer name held the page or screen better.

In 2018, Asner was cast in the Netflix dark comedy, Dead to Me, which premiered on May 3, 2019. The series also stars Christina Applegate, Linda Cardellini, and James Marsden. Asner also had a recurring guest role in the 2018–present series Cobra Kai, portraying Johnny Lawrence's step-father, Sid Weinberg, in seasons one and three. In 2020 he guest starred in an episode of Modern Family and in 2021 played himself in a sketch on Let's Be Real. The 2019 feature documentary Ed Asner: On Stage and Off premiered at the American Documentary Film Festival in Palm Springs, which Asner attended. In 2013, he played Santa in Christmas on the Bayou. Beginning in 2016, Asner took on the role of Holocaust survivor Milton Salesman in Jeff Cohen's acclaimed play The Soap Myth in a reading at Lincoln Center's Bruno Walter Theatre in New York City. He subsequently toured for the next three years in "concert readings" of the play in more than a dozen cities across the United States. In 2019, PBS flagship station WNET filmed the concert reading at New York's Center for Jewish History for their All Arts channel.  The performance, which is available for free, world-wide live-streaming, co-stars Tovah Feldshuh, Ned Eisenberg, and Liba Vaynberg. 

In the week before his death, Asner told his frequent collaborators, Greg Palast and Leni Badpenny, that he soon would be doing three one-act plays. 

At the time of his death in 2021, Asner had completed several roles in a number of TV series and films that were released posthumously, including three works released on the Disney+ streaming service, he reprised his voice as Carl Fredricksen from the Pixar film Up in the streaming animated series Dug Days, which premiered just three days after his death, Asner played the role of Claude in the Halloween special Muppets Haunted Mansion, and provided the voice of Grandpa Heffley in the 2022 animated film adaptation Diary of a Wimpy Kid: Rodrick Rules, released over a year after his death. These were all dedicated to his memory. The releases of Asner's upcoming projects on what would become his final roles are yet to be announced, but still in post-production.

Activism

Politics

Asner served two terms as president of the Screen Actors Guild, in which capacity during the 1980s he opposed United States policy in Central America, working closely with the Alliance for Survival. He played a prominent role in the 1980 SAG strike. He was also active in a variety of other causes, such as the movement to free Mumia Abu-Jamal and the movement to establish California One Care, single-payer health care in California, for which he created a television advertisement. He endorsed Dennis Kucinich in the 2004 United States presidential election, and Barack Obama during the 2008 United States presidential election. He was formerly a member of the Democratic Socialist Organizing Committee (DSOC) and was a member of DSOC's successor, the Democratic Socialists of America.

The sudden cancellation of Lou Grant in 1982 was the subject of much controversy. The show had high ratings, being in the ACNielsen top ten throughout its final month on the air. However, the CBS television network declined to renew it. Asner believed that his left-wing political views, as well as the publicity surrounding them, were the actual root causes for the show's cancellation. 

In 2011, Asner endorsed Democratic candidate Marcy Winograd who finished 4th in the 16-candidate primary behind eventual winner Janice Hahn, in  California's 36th congressional district special election.

From 2011 to 2015, Asner worked with filmmaker Nicole Zwiren on the feature-length documentary Behind the Fear which addresses HIV/AIDS denialism. The film was released in 2016 with Asner as the narrator.

Nonprofit organizations
Asner was on the Entertainment Board of Directors for The Survivor Mitzvah Project, a nonprofit organization dedicated to providing direct emergency aid to elderly and impoverished Holocaust survivors in Eastern Europe. Asner was a member of the Comic Book Legal Defense Fund, a free speech organization that is dedicated to protecting comic book creators and retailers from prosecutions based on content. He served as an advisor to the Rosenberg Fund for Children, an organization founded by the children of Julius and Ethel Rosenberg, which provides benefits for the children of political activists, and was a board member for the wildlife conservation organization Defenders of Wildlife. Asner also sat on the advisory board for Exceptional Minds, a non-profit school and a computer animation studio for young adults on the autism spectrum.

Asner was a supporter of Humane Borders, an organization based in Tucson, Arizona, which maintains water stations in the Sonoran desert for use by undocumented migrants, with the goal of preventing deaths by dehydration and exposure. He was the master of ceremonies at that organization's volunteer dinner in fall 2017.

In November 2017, The Ed Asner Family Center was founded by Asner's son, Matt, and daughter-in-law, Navah Paskowitz. The Center provides arts and vocational enrichments, counseling services, and support groups and camps to special needs individuals and their families.

September 11 attacks
Asner voiced qualified support for the 9/11 truth movement. In 2004, he signed a statement released by the group 9/11 Truth that included a call for a new investigation into some elements of the September 11 attacks that he questioned. Asner confirmed his support for the statement in 2009. Asner also narrated the documentary film The Oil Factor: Behind the War on Terror.

In April 2004, Asner wrote an open letter to "peace and justice leaders" encouraging them to demand "full 9–11 truth" through the organization 9-11 Visibility Project. In 2011, Asner hosted the Architects & Engineers for 9/11 Truth documentary on the collapse of 7 World Trade Center, which endorsed the conspiracy theory that the building was taken down by controlled demolition.

Opposition to SAG–AFTRA merger
On March 30, 2012, the Screen Actors Guild (SAG) and the American Federation of Television and Radio Artists (AFTRA) completed a merger of equals, forming a new union SAG-AFTRA. Asner was adamantly opposed to such a merger, arguing that the planned merger would destroy the SAG's health plan and disempower actors. Asner and a group of fellow actors and voice-actors, including Martin Sheen and Ed Harris, filed (but later dropped) a lawsuit against SAG president Ken Howard and several SAG vice presidents, seeking to have the merger overturned, and the two unions separated to their pre-merger organizations.

Local Theater/Community Development
In 2021, Asner traveled to Monte Rio, California to support the reopening, revitalization, and shifted focus of the local Monte Rio Theater.

Personal life
Asner was married to Nancy Lou Sykes from 1959 to 1988. They had three children, twins Matthew and Liza, and Kate. In 1987, he had a son named Charles with Carol Jean Vogelman. Asner was a parent and a grandparent to  autistic children and was involved with the 501(c)(3) nonprofit organization Autism Speaks. He also served as a board member and adviser for Aspiritech, a nonprofit organization that trains high-functioning autistic persons to test software and perform quality-assurance services for companies.

Asner became engaged to producer Cindy Gilmore in 1991. They married on August 2, 1998. Gilmore filed for legal separation on November 7, 2007. Asner filed for divorce in 2015.

Death
Asner died of natural causes at his home in the Tarzana neighborhood of Los Angeles, California, on the morning of August 29, 2021, at the age of 91. He was buried at Sheffield Cemetery in Kansas City, Missouri, on September 12.

Numerous celebrities paid tribute to Asner, including Maureen McCormick, George Takei, Mark Hamill, Michael McKean, Bradley Whitford, Josh Gad, Mia Farrow, Andy Richter, Katie Couric, Denis O'Hare, Mira Sorvino, Eric Stonestreet, Niecy Nash, Yvette Nicole Brown, Michael Moore, Rosario Dawson, Rosanna Arquette, Ben Stiller, The Muppets, William Baldwin, Greg Weisman, William Zabka, Ralph Macchio, Bill Farmer, and Zooey Deschanel.

References

External links

 
 
 
 
 
 
 

1929 births
2021 deaths
20th-century American Jews
20th-century American male actors
21st-century American Jews
21st-century American male actors
9/11 conspiracy theorists
Activists from California
Activists from Missouri
Activists from New York City
American conspiracy theorists
American male film actors
American male television actors
American male voice actors
American people of Lithuanian-Jewish descent
American people of Russian-Jewish descent
American people of Ukrainian-Jewish descent
American political activists
Audiobook narrators
Autism activists
Best Drama Actor Golden Globe (television) winners
Best Supporting Actor Golden Globe (television) winners
Burials in Missouri
Canadian Screen Award winners
Jewish American male actors
Jewish American military personnel
American trade union leaders
Male actors from Chicago
Male actors from Kansas City, Kansas
Male actors from Kansas City, Missouri
Male actors from New York City
Members of the Democratic Socialists of America
Military personnel from Missouri
Military personnel from New York City
Outstanding Performance by a Lead Actor in a Drama Series Primetime Emmy Award winners
Outstanding Performance by a Supporting Actor in a Comedy Series Primetime Emmy Award winners
People from Tarzana, Los Angeles
Presidents of the Screen Actors Guild
Screen Actors Guild Life Achievement Award
United States Army soldiers
University of Chicago alumni